{{Infobox Twitch streamer
| name = Emiru
| image = Emiru.png
| caption = Schunk in 2022
| birth_name = Emily Beth Schunk
| birth_date = 
| birth_place = Wichita, Kansas, U.S.
| death_date = 
| death_place = 
| occupation = 
| home_town = Wichita, Kansas U.S.
| location = Austin, Texas U.S.
| website = 
| channel_name = Emiru
| channel_display_name = 
| years_active = 2016–present
| genre = 
| games = {{flatlist|
League of LegendsSuper Mario 64}}
| followers = 1.1 million
| views = 16.1 million
| associated_acts = 
| module = 
| stats_update = February 25, 2023
}}
Emily-Beth Schunk (born January 3, 1998), better known as Emiru, is an American Twitch streamer and cosplayer. She is primarily known for streaming League of Legends and her cosplays on her Twitch channel, where she has garnered more than 1,100,000 followers as of January 15, 2023. She is a co-owner of and a content creator for the gaming organization One True King.

Early life
Schunk was born in Wichita, Kansas, on January 3, 1998, to a German-American father and a Chinese mother. She grew up in Wichita and graduated from high school in 2016.

Career
Schunk started streaming on Twitch in November of 2016 playing League of Legends, she later became known for this along with her cosplays.

On August 28, 2020, it was announced that Schunk had joined the esports organization Cloud9 as a content creator.

In 2021, the design of the newly released League'' champion Gwen was partially inspired by Schunk, whose cosplay was used as part of a reference board by a Riot Games illustrator working on the project. 

On January 2, 2022, it was announced that Schunk had joined gaming organization One True King as a content creator, resulting in the end of her contract with Cloud9. On January 31, 2023, Emiru was announced as a new co-owner of the organization. 

Schunk is represented by agency Ader Gaming.

Awards and nominations

References

External links

Cloud9 bio

1998 births
Living people
American people of Chinese descent
American people of German descent
Twitch (service) streamers
Cosplayers
People from Kansas
YouTubers from Texas
People from Austin, Texas